An auto-antonym or autantonym, also called a contronym or antagonym among other terms, is a word with multiple meanings (senses) of which one is the reverse of another. For example, the word cleave can mean "to cut apart" or "to bind together". This phenomenon is called enantiosemy, enantionymy (enantio- means "opposite"), antilogy or autantonymy. An enantiosemic term is necessarily polysemic.

Nomenclature 
An auto-antonym is alternatively called an antagonym, contronym, contranym, enantiodrome, enantionym, Janus word (after the Roman god Janus, who is usually depicted with two faces), self-antonym, antilogy, or addad (Arabic, singular didd).

Linguistic mechanisms 

Some pairs of contronyms are true homographs, i.e., distinct words with different etymology which happen to have the same form.  For instance cleave "separate" is from Old English clēofan, while cleave "adhere" is from Old English clifian, which was pronounced differently.

Other contronyms are a form of polysemy, but where a single word acquires different and ultimately opposite definitions. For example, sanction—"permit" or "penalize"; bolt (originally from crossbows)—"leave quickly" or "fix/immobilize"; fast—"moving rapidly" or "unmoving". Some English examples result from nouns being verbed in the patterns of "add <noun> to" and "remove <noun> from"; e.g. dust, seed, stone. Denotations and connotations can drift or branch over centuries. An apocryphal story relates how Charles II (or sometimes Queen Anne) described St Paul's Cathedral (using contemporaneous English) as "," with the meaning (rendered in modern English) of "awe-inspiring, majestic, and ingeniously designed".

Some contronyms result from differences in varieties of English. For example, to table a bill means "to put it up for debate" in British English, while it means "to remove it from debate" in American English (where British English would have "shelve", which in this sense has an identical meaning in American English). To barrack, in Australian English, is to loudly demonstrate support, while in British English it is to express disapproval and contempt.

Some words contain simultaneous opposing or competing meanings in the same context, rather than alternative meanings in different contexts; examples include blend words such as coopetition (meaning a murky blend of cooperation and competition), frenemy (meaning a murky blend of friend and enemy), glocalization, etc. These are not usually classed as contronyms, but they share the theme of containing opposing meanings.

In Latin,  has the double meaning "sacred, holy" and "accursed, infamous". Greek  gave Latin its , from which English got its demiurge, which can refer either to God as the creator or to the devil, depending on philosophical context.

In some languages, a word stem associated with a single event may treat the action of that event as unitary, so in translation it may appear contronymic. For example, Latin  can be translated as both "guest" and "host". In some varieties of English, borrow may mean both "borrow" and "lend".

Examples

English 

 Cleave can mean "to cling" or "to split apart".
 Clip can mean "attach" or "cut off". 
 Dust can mean "to remove dust” (cleaning a house) or "to add dust" (e.g., to dust a cake with powdered sugar).
 Fast can mean "without moving; fixed in place", (holding fast, also as in "steadfast"), or "moving quickly".
 Obbligato in music can refer to a passage that is either "obligatory" or "optional".
 Oversight can mean "accidental omission or error", or "close scrutiny and control".
 Peruse can mean to "consider with attention and in detail" or "look over or through in a casual or cursory manner".
 Ravel can mean "to separate" (e.g., threads in cloth) or "to entangle".
 Sanction can mean "approve" or "penalize".
 Table can mean "to discuss a topic at a meeting" (British English) or "to postpone discussion of a topic" (American English).

Other languages

Nouns
 The Korean noun 앞(ap) may mean either "future" or "past" (distinguished by context).

Verbs
 The German verb ausleihen, the Dutch verb lenen, the Polish verb pożyczyć, the Russian verb одолжить (odolžítʹ), the Finnish verb lainata, and the Esperanto verb prunti can mean either "to lend" or "to borrow", with case, pronouns, and mention of persons making the sense clear. The verb stem conveys that "a lending-and-borrowing event is occurring", and the other cues convey who is lending to whom. This makes sense because anytime lending is occurring, borrowing is simultaneously occurring; one cannot happen without the other.
 The Romanian verb a închiria, the French verb louer, and the Finnish verb vuokrata mean "to rent" (as the lessee does) as well as "to let" (as the lessor does). 
 The Swahili verb kutoa means both "to remove" and "to add". 
 The Chinese word "大败", it means both "be defeated" and "to defeat".
 The Persian verb چیدن (čidan) means both "to pluck" and "to arrange" (i.e. by putting objects down).
 In Spanish  (basic meaning "to give"), when applied to lessons or subjects, can mean "to teach", "to take classes" or "to recite", depending on the context.
 The Indonesian verb menghiraukan and mengacuhkan can mean "to regard" or "to ignore".
 The Indonesian/Malay adjective usah can mean "required" or "discouraged".

Adverbs
 can mean both "a while ago" and "in a little bit/later on"

Agent nouns
 The Italian, Spanish  and French cognates, ospite, huésped and hôte, respectively, also can mean "host" or "guest". The three words derive from the Latin hospes, which also carries both meanings.

Adjectives
The Latin sinister  meant both "auspicious" and "inauspicious", within the respective Roman and Greek traditions of augury. The negative meaning was carried on into French and ultimately English.
Latin  means "excessive, too much". It maintained this meaning in Spanish , but it was also misinterpreted as "insignificant, without importance".
In Vietnamese,  means among other things "bright, clear" (from Sino-Vietnamese  ) and "dead, gloomy" (from ).

In translation
Seeming auto-antonyms can occur from translation. In Hawaiian, for example, aloha is translated both as "hello" and as "goodbye", but the essential meaning of the word is "love", whether used as a greeting or farewell.  The Italian greeting ciao is translated as "hello" or "goodbye" depending on the context; the original meaning was "at your service" (literally "(I'm your) slave").

See also 
Skunked term
-onym
Oxymoron
Īhām

References

Further reading 
 Sheidlower, Jesse (1 November 2005). "The Word We Love To Hate". Slate.
 Leithauser, Brad (14 October 2013). "Unusable Words". The New Yorker.
 Schulz, Kathryn (7 April 2015). What Part of "No, Totally" Don't You Understand?. The New Yorker.

External links 

 Contranyms by language in Wiktionary
List of auto-antonyms

Semantics
Word play
False friends
Types of words
Dichotomies
Ambiguity
Polysemy